The Glen Waverley line is a commuter railway line in the city of Melbourne, Victoria, Australia. The line runs from Flinders Street station in central Melbourne to Glen Waverley station in the east, serving 20 stations via Burnley, Kooyong, East Malvern, and Jordanville. The line operates for approximately 19 hours a day (from approximately 5:15 am to around 12:00 am) with 24 hour service available on Friday and Saturday nights. During peak hour, headways of up to 10 minutes are operated with services every 10-30 minutes during off-peak hours. Trains on the Glen Waverley line run with a two three-car formations of X'Trapolis 100 trainsets.

Sections of the Glen Waverley line opened as early as 1890, with the line fully extended to Glen Waverley in 1930. The line was built to connect Melbourne with the rural towns of Kooyong, East Malvern, Mt Waverley, and Glen Waverley, amongst others. 

Since the 2010s, due to the heavily utilised infrastructure of the Glen Waverley line, significant improvements and upgrades have been made. Different packages of works have upgraded the corridor to replace sleepers, upgrading signalling technology, the introduction of new rolling stock, and the removal 2 out of the 6 remaining level crossings.

History

19th century 
A rail connection from Princes Bridge station to Punt Road (Richmond) was built by the Melbourne and Suburban Railway Company in 1859, with a branch line from Richmond to Burnley opening in 1861. In 1890, part of what would become the Glen Waverley line, opened from Burnley to Darling. At the same time in 1890, a line known as the Outer Circle line opened, running from Oakleigh station to Darling, continuing to Burnley with the line continuing north to Riversdale and beyond. The Outer Circle closed in sections between 1893 and 1897, with the Burnley to Waverley Road section of the line closing back to Darling in 1895.

20th century 
Electrification of the line to Glen Waverley occurred in three stages between 1922 and 1930. In March 1922, the section from Burnley to Darling station was electrified, with the section to East Malvern being electrified in June 1929, and the final section to Glen Waverley being completed by May 1930. The electrification of the line allowed for the introduction of Swing Door electric multiple unit trains for the first time.

The introduction of power signalling on the line begun in 1919 with the section from Richmond to East Richmond, with the remainder of the line converted in stages from 1922 to 1964. In 1929, the Glen Waverley line began construction on an extension from Darling to East Malvern along the original track of the Outer Circle line. The Outer Circle line previously begun its curve south towards Waverley Road and Oakleigh. The Glen Waverley line continued east towards Holmesglen.

The 1950s saw the line undergo major upgrades, including the first centralised traffic control installation in Australia. Commissioned in September 1957 at a length  in length, the Victorian Railways installed it as a prototype for the North East standard project. On 6 February 1956, the Toorak Road level crossing, between Kooyong and Tooronga stations, was the first in Victoria to receive boom barriers, replacing hand operated gates.

New Comeng trains were introduced to the Melbourne railway system in 1981. Initially, along with the Glen Waverley line, they were only allowed to operate on the Alamein, Belgrave, Dandenong and Lilydale lines, due to the width of the trains. Also in 1981, Glen Waverley line services commenced operations through the City Loop, after previously terminating at Flinders or Spencer Street stations. The commencement of operations involved the service stopping at three new stations—Parliament, Melbourne Central (formally Museum), and Flagstaff. The Loop follows La Trobe and Spring Streets along the northern and eastern edges of the Hoddle Grid. The Loop connects with Melbourne's two busiest stations, Flinders Street and Southern Cross, via the elevated Flinders Street Viaduct. 

Many stations were rebuilt and level crossings removed along the corridor through the construction of road bridges during the 1970s to the late 1980s. These works coincided with the construction of the Monash Freeway which runs alongside the route for part of the journey.

21st century 

In 2014, the Level Crossing Removal Project announced the removal of 2 level crossings on the Glen Waverley line, to be completed in 2016 and 2020. The removal of Burke Road, Glen Iris involved the lowering of the rail line and the reconstruction of Gardiner station. This was the first crossing to be removed by the project and was completed in 2016. The second removal involved raising the rail corridor above Toorak Road, Kooyong, with the crossing removed by early 2020. With the removal of 2 level crossings along the corridor, only 4 crossings now remain on the Glen Waverley line.

In 2021, the metropolitan timetable underwent a major rewrite, resulting in all Glen Waverley line trains operating via the City Loop alongside Alamein, Belgrave, and Lilydale services.

Network and operations

Services 
Services on the Glen Waverley line operates from approximately 5:15 am to around 12:00 am daily. In general, during peak hours, train frequency is 5-10 minutes while services during non-peak hours drops to 10–30 minutes throughout the entire route. Some express services do occur during peak hour by skipping unpopular stations. On Friday nights and weekends, services run 24 hours a day, with 60 minute frequencies available outside of normal operating hours.

Train services on the line are also subjected to maintenance and renewal works, usually on selected Fridays and Saturdays. Shuttle bus services are provided throughout the duration of works for affected commuters.

Stopping patterns 
Legend — Station status
 ◼ Premium Station – Station staffed from first to last train
 ◻ Host Station – Usually staffed during morning peak, however this can vary for different stations on the network.

Legend — Stopping patternsSome services do not operate via the City Loop
 ● – All trains stop
 ◐ – Some services do not stop
 | – Trains pass and do not stop

Operators 
The Glen Waverley line has had a total of 6 operators since its opening in 1888. The majority of operations throughout its history have been government run: from its first service in 1888 until the 1997 privatisation of Melbourne's rail network, three different government operators have run the line. These operators, Victorian Railways, the Metropolitan Transit Authority, and the Public Transport Corporation have a combined operational length of 109 years. In comparison, the three private operators, Hillside Trains, Connex Melbourne, and Metro Trains Melbourne have had a combined operational period of  years.

Route 

The Glen Waverley line forms a mostly curved route from the Melbourne central business district to its terminus in Glen Waverley. After departing from its terminus at Flinders Street, the Glen Waverley line traverses both flat and hilly country with few curves and fairly minimal earthworks for most of the line. The journey from Holmesglen to the terminus involves some of the steepest grades in Melbourne (1 in 30). However, sections of the line have been elevated or lowered into a cutting to eliminate level crossings. Despite some removals, there are a small number of level crossings still present with no current plans to remove them.

The line follows the same alignment as the Alamein, Belgrave, and Lilydale lines with the four services splitting onto different routes at Burnley. The Glen Waverley line continues on its south eastern alignment, whereas the Alamein, Belgrave, and Lilydale lines takes an eastern alignment towards their final destinations. All of the rail line goes through built-up suburbs towards its terminus in Glen Waverley.

Stations 
The line serves 20 stations across  of track. The stations are a mix of elevated, lowered, underground, and ground level designs. Underground stations are present only in the City Loop, with the majority of elevated and lowered stations being constructed as part of level crossing removals.

Infrastructure

Rolling stock 
The Glen Waverley line uses X'Trapolis 100 electric multiple unit (EMU) trains operating in a two three-car configuration, with three doors per side on each carriage and can accommodate of up to 432 seated passengers in each six car configuration. The trains were originally built between 2002 and 2004 as well as between 2009 and 2020 with a total of 212 three-car sets constructed. The trains are shared with 7 other metropolitan train lines and have been in service since 2003.

Alongside the passenger trains, Glen Waverley line tracks and equipment are maintained by a fleet of engineering trains. The four types of engineering trains are: the shunting train; designed for moving trains along non-electrified corridors and for transporting other maintenance locomotives, for track evaluation; designed for evaluating track and its condition, the overhead inspection train; designed for overhead wiring inspection, and the infrastructure evaluation carriage designed for general infrastructure evaluation. Most of these trains are repurposed locomotives previously used by V/Line, Metro Trains, and the Southern Shorthaul Railroad.

Accessibility 

In compliance with the Disability Discrimination Act of 1992, all stations that are new-built or rebuilt are fully accessible and comply with these guidelines. Half of stations on the corridor are fully accessible, however, there are some stations that haven't been upgraded to meet these guidelines. These stations do feature ramps, however, they have a gradient greater than 1 in 14. Stations that are fully accessible feature ramps that have a gradient less than 1 in 14, have at-grade paths, or feature lifts. These stations typically also feature tactile boarding indicators, independent boarding ramps, wheelchair accessible myki barriers, hearing loops, and widened paths.

Projects improving station accessibility have included the Level Crossing Removal Project, which involves station rebuilds and upgrades, and individual station upgrade projects. These works have made significant strides in improving network accessibility, with more than 50% of Glen Waverley line stations classed as fully accessible. Future station upgrade projects will continue to increase the number of fully accessible stations overtime.

Signalling 
The Glen Waverley line uses three position signalling which is widely used across the Melbourne train network. Three position signalling was first introduced on the line in 1919, with the final section of the line converted to the new type of signalling in 1964.

References

External links
 Glen Waverley line timetable
 Network map
 

Railway lines in Melbourne
Railway lines opened in 1890
1890 establishments in Australia
Public transport routes in the City of Melbourne (LGA)
Transport in the City of Yarra
Transport in the City of Stonnington
Transport in the City of Monash